Alejandro "Álex" Sánchez Benítez (born 3 February 1991) is a Spanish professional footballer who plays as a goalkeeper for CF Badalona.

References

External links

Álex Sánchez at La Preferente

1991 births
Living people
Spanish footballers
Footballers from Catalonia
Association football goalkeepers
Segunda División B players
Tercera División players
Real Zaragoza B players
Deportivo Alavés players
CF Badalona players
Valencia CF Mestalla footballers
UD Ibiza players
Serie C players
Calcio Foggia 1920 players
Spanish expatriate footballers
Spanish expatriate sportspeople in Italy
Expatriate footballers in Italy
Spain youth international footballers